CoreXY is a technique used to move the printhead of a 3D printer or the toolhead in CNC machines in the horizontal plane. The advantage of this technique is that the two motors used to perform the movement in the horizontal plane are stationary and do not have to move themselves, which can result in less moving mass. Instead, drive belts are used which are connected in an intricate way to provide movement in a Cartesian coordinate system.

Movement 
For movement along the x-axis, both motors must rotate in the same direction. For movement along the y-axis, the motors must rotate in opposite directions. If only one motor rotates, the movement will be diagonal.

The movement can be mathematically described as follows. If  is the movement of the first motor and  the movement of the second motor, the movement in the x and y directions is given by:

Compared to conventional printers 
Other Cartesian 3D printers which do not use the CoreXY technique most commonly also use two motors for the xy-plane, but where one motor is independently responsible for movement along the x-axis, and the other independently responsible for movement along the y-axis. This is sometimes called a Cartesian technique. "Bed slinger" is a cartesian variant where the build surface moves along the y-axis, and the print head moves along the x-axis, and this technique is used on amongst other the Prusa i3 and clones.

See also 
 Delta robot, a mechanism used in delta 3D printers

References 

Mechanisms (engineering)
3D printing